Sävedalens IF is a Swedish football club located in Sävedalen in Partille Municipality, Västra Götaland County.

Background
Since their foundation in 1932 Sävedalens IF has participated mainly in the middle and lower divisions of the Swedish football league system.  The club currently plays in Division 2 Norra Götaland which is the fourth tier of Swedish football.
They play their home matches at Vallhamra in Sävedalen.

Bertil "Bebben" Johansson started his career with Sävedalens IF. In 1954 he was bought by IFK Göteborg where he successfully spent the rest of his playing career that ended in 1968.

Sävedalens IF are affiliated to the Göteborgs Fotbollförbund.

Season to season

Attendances

In recent seasons Sävedalens IF have had the following average attendances:

Footnotes

External links
 Sävedalens IF – Official website

Football clubs in Gothenburg
Association football clubs established in 1932
1932 establishments in Sweden
Football clubs in Västra Götaland County